The 2008 WNBA season was the ninth season for the Seattle Storm. The Storm qualified for the postseason for the fifth consecutive season. Sue Bird was a key contributor to the club, averaging 14.1 points per game, and 5.1 assists per game. With the departure of the Seattle SuperSonics NBA franchise to Oklahoma City, the Storm were forced to look for 30 people in positions in marketing, public relations and corporate and ticket sales. The Storm had a shared services agreement with the Sonics, and the departure left the Storm with many positions vacant. By season's end, the Storm were in negotiations with the city of Seattle in hopes of a long-term lease at KeyArena.

Offseason
On November 30, 2007, the Storm announced the resignation of head coach, Anne Donovan. Her replacement, Brian Agler, was named on January 9, 2008

The following player was selected in the Expansion Draft:
 Betty Lennox was selected in the 2008 Expansion Draft for the Atlanta Dream.
 Also acquired the fourth pick in the 2008 WNBA Draft and Roneeka Hodges from the Atlanta Dream for Iziane Castro Marques and the eighth pick in the draft.

WNBA Draft

Transactions

Trades

Free agents

Regular season

Season standings

Season schedule

WNBA Playoffs

Player stats

Regular season

Seattle Storm Regular Season Stats

Postseason

Seattle Storm Playoff Stats

Roster

Awards and honors
 Lauren Jackson, WNBA Player of the Week (June 30 - July 6)
 Lauren Jackson, ESPY Award for Best WNBA Player
 Lauren Jackson, WNBA All-Defensive Second Team (Forward)
 Sue Bird, All-WNBA Second Team (Guard)
 Lauren Jackson, All-WNBA Second Team (Forward)

References

Seattle Storm seasons
Seattle
2008 in sports in Washington (state)